The Taylor C-2 was a light utility aircraft made by the Taylor Aircraft Company in the late 1920s.

Design
The C-2 design featured a two-seat, parasol monoplane. The pilot and passenger sat in the cabin side by side. One of the seven C-2s built had a wing modified with a seven-degree, variable-incidence wing for entry into the Guggenheim Safe Airplane Competition.

Specifications (C-2)

References

C-2
1920s United States civil utility aircraft
Single-engined tractor aircraft
Aircraft first flown in 1929